The Frauen DFB-Pokal 1994–95 was the 15th season of the cup competition, Germany's second-most important title in women's football. In the final which was held in Berlin on 24 June 1995, FSV Frankfurt defeated TSV Siegen 3–1, thus winning their fourth cup title. As Frankfurt had won the championship six weeks before they claimed the Double, too, the only one in the club's history.

First round 

Several clubs had byes in the first round.  Those clubs were automatically qualified for the 2nd round of the cup.

Second round

Third round

Quarter-finals

Semi-finals

Final

See also 
 Bundesliga 1994–95
 1994–95 DFB-Pokal men's competition

References 

DFB-Pokal Frauen seasons
Pokal
Fra